The trigeminovascular system consists of neurons in the trigeminal nerve that innervate cerebral blood vessels. It has been hypothesized that the trigeminovascular system may be involved in some types of headaches.

See also 
 Umbellulone

References

External links 
 Pain: Current Understanding, Emerging Therapies, and Novel Approaches to Drug Discovery, Second Edition by Rajesh Munglani, William K. Schmidt and Chas Bountra, page 321
 Functional MRI by Chrit T. W. Moonen, P. A. Bandettini, page 21
 Craniofacial dysfunction and pain: manual therapy, assessment and management by Harry Von Piekartz, Lynn Bryden, page 90

Trigeminal nerve